Miss USA 1989 was the 38th Miss USA pageant, televised live from the Mobile Civic Center Theatre in Mobile, Alabama on February 28, 1989.  At the conclusion of the final competition, Gretchen Polhemus of Texas was crowned by outgoing titleholder Courtney Gibbs.  She was the fifth consecutive Miss Texas USA to win the pageant.

This was the first Miss USA pageant hosted by Dick Clark (The Miss Universe Pageant was hosted by John Forsythe that year), with color commentary by Angie Dickinson.  This pageant was held in Alabama for the first and so far only time.

Results

Placements

Special awards

Final competition

 Winner 
 First runner-up
 Second runner-up 
 Third runner-up
 Fourth runner-up
 Top 10 semifinalist
(#)  Rank in each round of competition

Preliminary Swimsuit

Historical significance 
 Texas wins competition for the sixth time and fifth in a row. 
 Oklahoma earns the 1st runner-up position for the first time and surpasses its previous highest placement in 1952, becoming its highest placement of the state until 2015.
 New Jersey earns the 2nd runner-up position for the first time and surpasses its previous highest placement in 1977, becoming its highest placement of the state.
 Louisiana earns the 3rd runner-up position for the fourth time. The last time it placed this was in 1985.
 Georgia earns the 4th runner-up position for the fifth time. The last time it placed this was in 1987.
 States that placed in semifinals the previous year were California, Georgia, Illinois, Oklahoma and Texas.
 Texas placed for the fifteenth consecutive year.
 Illinois placed for the sixth consecutive year. 
 Georgia placed for the fourth consecutive year. 
 California and Oklahoma made their second consecutive placement.
 Arizona last placed in 1987.
 Louisiana last placed in 1985.
 New Jersey last placed in 1977.
 Pennsylvania last placed in 1983.
 Colorado last placed in 1969.
 Florida breaks an ongoing streak of placements since 1987.
 Mississippi breaks an ongoing streak of placements since 1986.

Judges
The following celebrities were invited to judge the competition:
Jude Deveraux – Author
Bonnie Kay – Modeling manager
Dick Rutan – Pilot of the Voyager aircraft
Jeana Yeager – Pilot of the Voyager aircraft
Stella Stevens – Actress
Roscoe Tanner – Tennis player
Linda Shelton – Aerobics instructor
Lillian Glass – Author
Richard Anderson – Actor
Cecilia Bolocco – Miss Universe 1987 from Chile
Jennifer Chandler – Olympic diver

Delegates
The Miss USA 1989 delegates were:

 Alabama - Sherri Mooney
 Alaska - Tina Geraci
 Arizona - LeeAnne Locken
 Arkansas - Paige Yandell
 California - Christina Faust
 Colorado - Debbie James
 Connecticut - Lisa Vendetti
 Delaware - Terri Spruill
 District of Columbia - Somaly Sieng
 Florida - Jennifer Parker
 Georgia - Michelle Nemeth
 Hawaii - Julie Larson
 Idaho - Kelli Bean
 Illinois - Kelly Holub
 Indiana - Gwen Rochelle Volpe
 Iowa - Marcy Requist
 Kansas - Nancy Burris
 Kentucky - Veronica Hensley
 Louisiana - Elizabeth Primm
 Maine - Kirsten Blakemore
 Maryland - Jackie Carroll
 Massachusetts - Kimberley Wallace
 Michigan - Karyn Finucan
 Minnesota - Julie Knutson
 Mississippi - Laura Durrett
 Missouri - Rhonda Hoglan
 Montana - Tammy Reiter
 Nebraska - Rene Harter
 Nevada - Janu Tornell
 New Hampshire - Fayleen Chwalek
 New Jersey - Deborah Lee Husti
 New Mexico - Traci Brubaker
 New York - Jennifer Fisher
 North Carolina - Jacqueline Padgett
 North Dakota - Cara Christofferson
 Ohio - Lisa Thompson
 Oklahoma - Jill Rene Scheffert
 Oregon - Jennifer Blaska
 Pennsylvania - Denise Epps
 Rhode Island - Debra Damiano
 South Carolina - Angela Shuler
 South Dakota - Nanette Endres
 Tennessee - Kimberly Payne
 Texas - Gretchen Polhemus
 Utah - Zanetta van Zyverden
 Vermont - Stacey Palmer
 Virginia - Kimberly Nicewonder
 Washington - Chiann Fan Gibson
 West Virginia -  Kathy Eicher
 Wisconsin -  Sherri Leigh Baxter
 Wyoming - Chandra Anderson

Contestant notes
Gretchen Polhemus (Texas) and LeeAnne Locken (Arizona) had competed against each other the previous year in the Miss Texas USA 1988 pageant.  Polhemus placed second runner-up to winner Courtney Gibbs, and Locken was third runner-up.

References

External links
Official website

1989
1989 beauty pageants
1989 in the United States
February 1989 events in the United States
1989